Mt. Hope–Highland Historic District is a national historic district located at Rochester in Monroe County, New York. The district was the exclusive domain of the Ellwanger and Barry Botanic Gardens and Mt. Hope Cemetery throughout the mid- and late-19th century.  It retains its elegant and spacious character of park land.  The district is punctuated with notable architect-designed buildings combined with more tightly knit early 20th century subdivision along the district's fringes.  Among the notable buildings are the Warner Castle (1854), a 22-room mansion that is home to the Rochester Garden Center.  The Mt. Hope Cemetery includes a little Gothic chapel designed by Andrew Jackson Warner.

It was listed on the National Register of Historic Places in 1974.

References

External links

Historic districts in Rochester, New York
Gothic Revival architecture in New York (state)
Historic districts on the National Register of Historic Places in New York (state)
National Register of Historic Places in Rochester, New York